Christopher Casement (born 12 January 1988) is a Northern Irish former professional footballer who is currently player/manager of Stowmarket Town since 2020. He began his senior career with Ipswich Town from 2005 to 2010, during which time he was participated in several loans. He played for Dundee for one year from 2009 to 2010, and in the 2010s, he played for Linfield and Portadown. He also played internationally for Northern Ireland between 2007 and 2009, primarily for the under-21 football team.

Early life 
Casement attended Newtownbreda High School in south Belfast.

Club career
After accomplished displays in the FA Cup, most notably against Swansea City and Watford in January 2007, Casement moved out on loan to Millwall for three months. When he did finally join Millwall, he did not make an appearance during his month there.

In August 2008, he signed on loan with Hamilton Academical until January 2009. Chances were limited for Casement, and he returned to Ipswich having mainly been used as a substitute. On 7 January 2009, Casement signed on loan for League Two side Wycombe Wanderers for a month. This loan deal was subsequently extended, firstly to two months, then to three months. Casement returned to Ipswich before being released on 8 May.

On 22 June, it was announced that he had signed a three-year deal with Scottish First Division side Dundee.

On 31 January, Casement signed on loan for Linfield until the end of the season. On 4 May 2010, he was informed along with three other players that he was no longer wanted by Dundee and was free to look for another club. On 8 May 2012, it was confirmed Casement had signed a three-year contract with Portadown. On 26 July 2016, it was announced that Portadown had accepted a bid in the region of £20,000 for Casement and it was announced later that he would be rejoining the Blues on a two-year contract.

On 30 September 2020, Casement signed for Stowmarket Town. He was appointed manager of the club in February 2023.

International career
Casement was called up to the Northern Ireland squad in May 2009, along with nine other uncapped players for the international friendly against Italy on 6 June. He made his international debut, along with seven other debutants, in the 3–0 defeat against Italy in the friendly match at Arena Garibaldi in Pisa. Casement played the full match.

Career statistics

Club

International
Source:

Honours
Ipswich Town
FA Youth Cup: 2004–05

Linfield
IFA Premiership: 2010–11, 2011–12, 2012–13, 2016–17, 2018–19
Irish Cup: 2010–11, 2011–12, 2012–13, 2016–17

Individual
Ipswich Town Young Player of the Year: 2004–05

References

External links
Chris Casement player profile at itfc.co.uk

1988 births
Living people
Association footballers from Belfast
Association footballers from Northern Ireland
Association football defenders
Northern Ireland international footballers
Northern Ireland B international footballers
Northern Ireland under-21 international footballers
Expatriate footballers in England
English Football League players
Ipswich Town F.C. players
Millwall F.C. players
Expatriate footballers in Scotland
Scottish Premier League players
Hamilton Academical F.C. players
Wycombe Wanderers F.C. players
Dundee F.C. players
Linfield F.C. players
Portadown F.C. players
Stowmarket Town F.C. players
Stowmarket Town F.C. managers
NIFL Premiership players